The IAAF Hammer Throw Challenge was an annual hammer throw series, organized by the International Association of Athletics Federations (IAAF) from 2010 until the end of 2019 season. The series of hammer throw competitions for men and women were primary held at meetings with IAAF World Challenge status. The rankings were decided by combining the total (in metres) of each athlete's three greatest throws at the permit events during the season. Further points could be gained by those who broke or equalled the world record mark for the event.

The competition's creation was a result of the IAAF Golden League being replaced by the IAAF Diamond League in 2010 – hammer throw was the sole track and field event not to feature on the new top level circuit. The challenge was designed to allow hammer throwers to compete in a global seasonal competition, similar to that found for other track and field events on the Diamond League. In 2020, World Athletics launched the World Continental Tour including hammer throw competitions.

The total prize money available in 2010 was US$202,000, split evenly between male and female athletes. The male and female winners each received $30,000, while second and third placed athletes were entitled to $20,000 and $14,000 respectively. Increasingly smaller prizes were given to the remaining throwers who rank in the top twelve. The eleven meetings which had permit status in 2010 offered either a men's contest, a women's contest, or both – an arrangement which gave athletes of each sex a total of seven opportunities to score points for the challenge.

The most successful athlete of the series was Poland's Anita Włodarczyk, who won the women's title six times straight from 2013 to 2018. Her compatriot Paweł Fajdek was the most successful man, with five victories. Germany's Betty Heidler and Hungarian Krisztián Pars have each won the title on three occasions. Fajdek holds the men's series record score of 248.48 metres while Włodarczyk is the women's series record holder with 240.44 metres.

Editions

Meetings

Key:
 M : Men
 W : Men
 B : Both

The Osaka meet was held at the Kawasaki Todoroki Stadium in Kawasaki, Kanagawa in 2011, 2012, 2015 and 2017, and was held at the National Stadium in Tokyo in 2013 and 2014
The 2013 Gyulai István Memorial was held in Budapest
The 2014 Rabat meeting was held in Marrakesh
The Brazilian meet was held at the Arena Caixa Atletismo in São Bernardo do Campo in 2016 and 2017, and at the National Training Centre in Bragança Paulista in 2018 and 2019
The 2018 and 2019 Janusz Kusociński Memorial was held at the Silesian Stadium in Chorzów

Medalists

Men

Women

See also
IAAF Race Walking Challenge
IAAF World Cross Challenge
IAAF Combined Events Challenge

References

External links
Homepage
Years in review: 2010, 2011, 2012, 2013, 2014, 2015

 
Recurring sporting events established in 2010
Hammer Throw Challenge
Hammer throw
Annual athletics series